Ali Panah (also Romanized as ‘Alī Panāh; also known as Boneh-ye ‘Alī) is a village in Qaleh-ye Khvajeh Rural District, in the Central District of Andika County, Khuzestan Province, Iran. At the 2006 census, its population was 34, in 7 families.

References 

Populated places in Andika County